Rick Hancox (born January 1, 1946) is a Canadian filmmaker and film studies academic. He is most noted for his short film Moose Jaw: There's a Future in Our Past, which received a special jury citation for the Toronto International Film Festival Award for Best Canadian Short Film at the 1992 Toronto International Film Festival.

A graduate of Ohio University and New York University's Tisch School of the Arts, he taught film studies at Sheridan College from 1973 to 1985, and joined Concordia University in 1986. His other films have included Rose (1968), Cab 16 (1969), I, a Dog (1970), Tall Dark Stranger (1970), Next to Me (1971), Rooftops (1971), House Movie (1972), Wild Sync (1973), Home for Christmas (1978), Zum Ditter (1979), Reunion in Dunnville (1981), Waterworx (A Clear Day and No Memories) (1982), Landfall (1983), Beach Events (1984) and All That Is Solid (2003).

Filmography 

 Rose (1968)
 Cab 16 (1969)
 I, a Dog (1970)
 Tall Dark Stranger (1970)
 Next to Me (1971)
 Rooftops (1971)
 House Movie (1972)
 Wild Sync (1973)
 Home for Christmas (1978)
 This is the Title of My Film (1979)
 Zum Ditter (1979)
 Reunion in Dunnville (1981)
 Waterworx (A Clear Day and No Memories) (1982)
 Landfall (1983)
 Beach Events (1984)
 Moose Jaw: There's a Future in Our Past (1992)

References

External links 
 

1946 births
Living people
Film directors from Saskatchewan
Film producers from Ontario
Canadian experimental filmmakers
Academic staff of Concordia University
Film directors from Toronto
Film producers from Saskatchewan